Dennis Fernando Salinas Bermúdez (born 23 July 1986) is a Salvadoran professional goalkeeper.

Club career
Salinas started his career at San Salvador FC and joined FAS for the Clausura 2008 tournament.

After only one season with FAS, he left them for Alianza and he moved to Atlético Balboa for the Clausura 2010 tournament. He also left Alianza after only one season and signed with Luis Ángel Firpo in 2010.

Except for his period at San Salvador FC and his short stint at Atlético Balboa he has primarily been used as a back-up goalkeeper.

He didn't have much activity with Luis Ángel Firpo, the most important game he had on the team was against Xolos de Tijuana on 2013–14 CONCACAF Champions League.

He was the master piece of the team that night, because of his great match against the Mexican team, but he got injured and was the last game he played with Luis Ángel Firpo.

Before a whole season injured he signed Atlético Marte in August 2014. However, with Atlético Marte Salinas experienced an administrative crisis, arrears in salary payments and pressures from directives of the team, leading Salinas to leave the club after Atlético Marte's descent in the Clausura 2016 tournament.

In the Apertura 2016 Salinas signed with Chalatenango. However, with the scorpion's team Salinas he barely had minutes and left the club in 2017.

In 2018 Salinas signed with Brujos de Izalco of Segunda División.

International career
Salinas' made his debut with El Salvador on August 22, 2007 against Honduras.

His next game came only a couple of weeks later in a friendly match against Ecuador.

Controversially, Salinas (who was the starting goalkeeper) was subbed out after only 34 minutes for Juan José Gómez.

Many thought this was a harsh decision by Mexican coach Carlos de los Cobos, and believed that although Salinas had conceded two goals it was more due to poor defence rather than the goalkeeper mistakes.

Since this game Salinas has not returned to the national team, and has not participated or been invited to attend any of the national team's training camps again.

References

External links

1986 births
Living people
Sportspeople from San Salvador
Association football goalkeepers
Salvadoran footballers
El Salvador international footballers
San Salvador F.C. footballers
C.D. FAS footballers
Alianza F.C. footballers
Atlético Balboa footballers
C.D. Luis Ángel Firpo footballers